Kim Kyung-Choon (born 27 January 1984) is a South Korean football player.

Club career

National League
He started his career at Korea National League side Ulsan Hyundai Mipo. One season later, he joined Korean Police FC for military duty for two years. He came back to Korea National League side Suwon City FC from 2009 season.

Gangwon FC
On 17 November 2009, he parted 2010 K-League draft, but he wasn't called any clubs in 2010 K-League draft. Kim joined Gangwon FC lately in the preseason. His first K-League match was against Pohang Steelers in Pohang, which Gangwon lost 0-4 in an away game on 20 March 2010.

Back to National League
In July 2010, he moved back to Korea National League side Busan Transportation Corporation.

Statistics 

Note: appearances and goals include championship playoffs.

References

External links
 

1984 births
Living people
Association football midfielders
South Korean footballers
Korean Police FC (Semi-professional) players
Suwon FC players
Gangwon FC players
Korea National League players
K League 1 players
K League 2 players